Jabłonka Kościelna  is a village in the administrative district of Gmina Wysokie Mazowieckie, within Wysokie Mazowieckie County, Podlaskie Voivodeship, in north-eastern Poland.

The village has a population of 160.

References

Villages in Wysokie Mazowieckie County
Białystok Voivodeship (1919–1939)